The 1946–47 Rugby Football League season was the 52nd season of rugby league football.

Season summary

1946-47 ended up being the longest season on record after a poor winter saw many matches postponed. Just as the country was recovering from post-World War II fuel and food shortages, it had to cope with prolonged frost and snow from 21 January to 16 March.

Wigan won their sixth Championship when they beat Dewsbury 13-4 in the play-off final at Maine Road, Manchester in front of a crowd of 40,599. Wigan scored three tries and two goals to Dewsbury's two goals. Wigan had also ended the regular season as league leaders.

The Challenge Cup winners were Bradford Northern who were 8-4 winners over Leeds.

Leigh returned following World War II. Broughton Rangers relocated, and were renamed Belle Vue Rangers.

Wigan won the Lancashire League, and Dewsbury won the Yorkshire League. Wigan beat Belle Vue Rangers 9–3 to win the Lancashire County Cup, and Wakefield Trinity beat Hull F.C. 10–0 to win the Yorkshire County Cup.

Championship

Play-offs

Challenge Cup

Leeds reached the Wembley final for the second time, doing so without conceding a single point in the final five rounds of the tournament. However Bradford Northern beat Leeds 8-4 in the final in front of a crowd of 77,605. Trevor Foster and Emlyn Walters scored Bradford's tries and were converted by Ernest Ward. Willie Davies, Bradford Northern's stand-off half back, won the Lance Todd Trophy for man of the match.

This was Bradford’s third Cup Final win in five Final appearances including one win and one loss during World War II.

Sources
 1946-47 Rugby Football League season at wigan.rlfans.com
 The Challenge Cup at The Rugby Football League website

References

1946 in English rugby league
1947 in English rugby league
Northern Rugby Football League seasons